Brian Pfarr (born November 27, 1968) is an American politician serving in the Minnesota House of Representatives since 2021. A member of the Republican Party of Minnesota, Pfarr represents District 22B south of the Twin Cities metropolitan area, including the cities of Belle Plaine and Le Sueur and portions of Blue Earth, Le Sueur, Rice and Scott counties.

Early life, education and career 
Pfarr grew up on a farm near Gaylord, Minnesota. He earned a Bachelor of Science degree in business management and a Master of Science in education from the Minnesota State University, Mankato.

From 1987 to 2021, Pfarr served in the Minnesota Army National Guard, retiring with the rank of colonel. He was awarded the Bronze Star Medal for his military service.

From 2000 to 2005, Pfarr was a farm business management instructor at South Central College in North Mankato, Minnesota. Since 2005, he has been president of the Minnesota branch of First Farmers & Merchants Bank.

Pfarr served on the Le Sueur Economic and Development Authority Committee, a member of the Comprehensive Panning Working Group, and a member of the Le Sueur-Henderson School Board.

Minnesota House of Representatives 
Pfarr was elected to the Minnesota House of Representatives in 2020 and was reelected in 2022. Pfarr first ran after three-term Republican incumbent Bob Vogel announced he would not seek reelection. 

Pfarr serves on the Commerce Finance and Policy, Legacy Finance, and Ways and Means Committees.

Electoral history

Personal life 
Pfarr lives in Le Sueur, Minnesota with his spouse, Kristan, and has two children. His second cousin is Pam Altendorf, who has served in the Minnesota House of Representatives since 2023.

References

External links 

 Official House of Representatives website
 Official campaign website

Living people
People from Le Sueur, Minnesota
Republican Party members of the Minnesota House of Representatives
Minnesota State University, Mankato alumni
People from North Mankato, Minnesota
21st-century American politicians
Year of birth missing (living people)